Return of Sergeant Lapins ( or initially Tas notika ar viņiem) is a 2010 comedy-drama film directed by Latvian director Gatis Šmits.

The film's plot is based on the play Tas notika ar viņiem (That Happened to Them) written by Gatis Šmits and produced in The New Theatre of Riga in 2007.

Before being released on 26 November, the film was screened at the 15th Busan International Film Festival, which took place in October 2010.

Plot 
The film is set in Riga, where Sergeant Krists Lapiņš returns from an international mission and moves into a remote flat in the city's Āgenskalns district. However, although expecting to live a peaceful life, Krists finds himself involved in several adventures.

Cast 
Andris Keišs as Krists Lapiņš
Guna Zariņa as Alise Lagzdiņa
Gatis Gāga as Didzis Budļevskis
Vilis Daudziņš as Ervīns Meijers
Kaspars Znotiņš as Dainis Geidmanis
Baiba Broka as Maira Mežsarga
Linda Šingireja as Ināra Meijere
Igors Ziemelis as Mazais

References

External links 
  
 

2010 films
Latvian comedy-drama films
Latvian-language films
Swedish comedy-drama films
2010 comedy-drama films
2010s Swedish films